= Reynette of Koblenz =

14th century German Jewish female moneylender

Reynette of Koblenz (born circa 1340, d. after 1390) was a German-Jewish moneylender in Koblenz.

She was first married to Leo von Münstermaifeld and secondly to Moses Bonenfant. She became active as a moneylender as a widow and continued independently during her second marriage. In the 12th-century, Jewish leaders established the precedent that married women, while their businesses were always to be formally considered to be a part of the business of their husbands, were in practice still to be allowed to handle their own affairs independently.

She was a substantial moneylender in the region, and the size of her financial dealings surpassed those of both her husbands. In 1372, she raised the exceptional sum of eight thousand guildens to meet the demands of the Andernacher city fathers.
